The Manila Central Post Office, often called the Post Office Building, is the main postal office of Manila, which also serves as the home of the Philippine Postal Corporation. It also houses the main mail sorting-distribution operations of the Philippines.

It is located along the riverbanks in Lawton, Ermita and lies at the northern end of Liwasang Bonifacio. Its location along the frontage of the Pasig River was a part of the Burnham Plan of Manila for easy water transportation of mails. Its central location with converging avenues made the building readily accessible from all sides.  The building's main entrance faces the Liwasang Bonifacio.

The original building was designed by Juan M. Arellano and Tomás Mapúa in neoclassical style. The construction of the building began on 1926 under the supervision of the architecture firm of Pedro Siochi and Company. However, it was severely damaged in World War II during the Battle of Manila and was subsequently rebuilt in 1946 while retaining most of its original design.

History 

This official transmitter of mail, money and goods traces its beginnings to Act No. 462 of the Philippine Commission on September 15, 1902, creating the Bureau of Posts. Postal service in the country, albeit crude and slow, began during the Spanish period with horse-riding couriers until it reached the marked improvements which the Americans initiated. The present building hums daily with brisk postal service with letters pouring in daily from every corner of the country.

Now under the direct supervision of the Office of the President, the principal postal hub of today's Philippine Postal Corporation houses a modern and efficient look with its mechanized automatic letter-sorting machine, new Postal Code system, airmail, motorized letter carriers and all other new facilities. Even as more modern ways of communication are widespread, PHLPost and the MCPO still continue a centuries-old tradition of sorting and distributing letters from Filipinos who still prefer the postal service.

Architecture 

The Manila Post Office was strategically located by Daniel Burnham at the foot of Jones Bridge because of two reasons. First was that the Pasig River could be used conveniently as an easy route for delivering mail and secondly, the post office could be accessible from all sides including Quiapo, Binondo, Malate, and Ermita.

Considered to be Juan Arellano's magnum opus, it was designed in the neoclassical style that expressed order and balance. It was built in 1926 and was worth one million pesos. Fronting the huge, rectangular volume are the 16 Ionic pillars lined that are lined up above the steps just before entering the lobby. The main body of the building is capped by a recessed rectangular attic storey and flanked and buttressed by two semi-circular wings. Inside, the main lobby has subsidiary halls at each end housed under the semi-circular spaces roofed with domes.

The plans on completing the post office building was made public on November 28, 1927, but the awarding of the project happened a year after in 1928. From August 2, 1920, up to January 9, 1922, the foundation was laid out. The work was put on hold because of the scarcity of funds but was reported to be 56% complete towards the end of the year. The completion of the building was continued in February 1928.

Proposals for the completion of the Manila Post Office Building were made known on November 28, 1927, but the awarding of the project was made only in 1928.

Gallery

References

External links

Philippine Postal Corporation
Trivia about the Postman Statue of the Philippine Postal Service

Post office buildings
Buildings and structures in Ermita
Government buildings in the Philippines
Postal system of the Philippines
Neoclassical architecture in the Philippines
Buildings and structures completed in 1926
Cultural Properties of the Philippines in Metro Manila
Juan M. Arellano buildings
National Historical Landmarks of the Philippines
Reportedly haunted locations in the Philippines